is the fourth studio album by Japanese singer MIE. The album was released through Polydor Records on April 25, 1992. It was reissued on October 24, 2007 as Diamond & Gold +1, with one bonus track.

Track listing 

2007 CD bonus track

References

External links

 
 

1992 albums
Mie albums
Japanese-language albums
Polydor Records albums